Debaratna Road, officially known as Highway 34 Bang Na–Nong Mai Daeng Route (ทางหลวงแผ่นดินหมายเลข 34 สายบางนา–หนองไม้แดง), and still known colloquially —and officially in Bangkok— as Bang Na–Trat Road (ถนนบางนา–ตราด) is a highway in Thailand from Bangkok that heads to the east like Sukhumvit Road (Highway 3) and Motorway 7 (Bangkok−Ban Chang Motorway).

History
Originally, there was no official name for Highway 34. Therefore, people call the road from the beginning to the end, along with Sukhumvit Road, was Bang Na–Trat Road. And still popularly known as this until the Department of Highways has designated the official name according to the true end of the route as Bang Na–Bang Pakong Highway (ทางหลวงสายบางนา–บางปะกง). However, Bangkok Metropolitan Administration (BMA) has defined its distance in Bangkok as "Bang Na–Trat Road" as it is commonly known as.

Bang Pakong Bridge, also formerly known as Devahastin Bridge is a bridge crossing the Bang Pakong River in Bang Pakong district that opened before the road since 1951.

In 1986, Bang Na–Trat Road there was a toll fee at the 41st kilometer (area of Bang Wua, Chachoengsao province) along with Highway 32 (Asian Highway Route), but it was canceled according to a cabinet resolution in 1994.

On June 29, 2016, Princess Maha Chakri Sirindhorn has officially given the name "Debaratna Road".

Route

Debaratana Road begins in Bangkok, as a continuation of Sanphawut Road (Highway 3102 Bang Na–Sanphawut Route) at Bang Na intersection where it cuts across Sukhumvit Road. Then it went straight to the east, the administrative boundary line between Bang Na Nuea and Bang Na Tai subdistricts of Bang Na district up until the bridge over the Khlong Bang Na canal therefore entered Samut Prakan province through the districts of Bang Phli,  Bang Sao Thong and Bang Bo. Sukhumvit Road and Highway 361 (Chonburi Bypass Road) are the continuous routes.

Burapha Withi Expressway runs parallel to it almost all the way.

Bordering the road are the Nation Multimedia Group (NMG), Wat Sri Iam, Bangkok Mall, Central Bangna, Mega Bangna, Bangkok International Trade and Exhibition Centre (BITEC), Thainakarin Hospital, Bangna General Hospital 1, Nation University, Huachiew Chalermprakiet University (HCU), Ramkhamhaeng University (Bang Na Campus) etc.

References

External links
 ระบบสารสนเทศโครงข่ายทางหลวง  

National highways in Thailand
Streets in Bangkok
Bang Na district
Roads in Thailand